Ceyhun (also spelled Jeyhun) is a masculine Turkish given name.

People
 Jeyhun Abiyev, Azerbaijani boxer
 Ceyhun Eriş, Turkish footballer
 Ceyhun Gülselam, Turkish footballer
 Jeyhun Hajibeyov, Azerbaijani publicist and journalist
 Jeyhun Sultanov, Azerbaijani footballer
 Ceyhun Tendar, Turkish volleyball player
 Ceyhun Yazar, Turkish footballer
 Ceyhun Yıldızoğlu, Turkish basketball coach

See also
 Amu Derya, major river in Central Asia, Ceyhun is the Turkish name for the river 

Turkish masculine given names